In the 7th Moon, the Chief Turned Into a Swimming Fish and Ate the Head of His Enemy by Magic is the first album by Congolese musical collective Kasai Allstars.

Track listing

Reception

The album was well received by critics: according to Metacritic, the album has received an average review score of 83/100, based on 16 reviews.

References

2008 albums